Tank farm may refer to the:

Alternate name for an oil terminal or oil depot, a facility for storage of liquid petroleum products or petrochemicals
Tank Farm, also known as 'Tuff Crater', a volcanic crater in the Auckland Volcanic Field, New Zealand
Western Reclamation, also known as the 'Tank Farm', on the Waitemata Harbour in Auckland, New Zealand